KION may refer to:

 KION-TV, a television station (channel 46 analog/32 digital) licensed to Monterey, California, United States
 KION (AM), a radio station (1460 AM) licensed to Salinas, California, United States
 KION Group, a manufacturer of materials handling equipment